Allancastria cretica is a butterfly belonging to the family Papilionidae. It was described by Rebel in 1904. It is found only on the Greek island of Crete where it is, then, an endemic species.

References

Carbonell, F., 1996 Contribution à la connaissance du genre Allancastria Bryk (1934): Morphologie, biologie et écologie d’Allancastria cretica (Rebel, 1904) (Lepidoptera: Papilionidae). Linneana Belgica 15: 303-308.
Hürter, W., 2001. Ein Beitrag zur Biologie einiger Populationen des Zerynthia (Allancastria) Artenkreises in der östlichen Mediterraneis (Lepidoptera: Papilionidae). Entomologische Zeitschrift 111: 8-17.

External links
TOL

Papilionidae
Butterflies described in 1904
Butterflies of Europe
Endemic arthropods of Crete
Taxa named by Hans Rebel